Tramonti is a town and comune in the province of Salerno in the Campania region of south-western Italy. It is located in the territory of the Amalfi Coast.

Geography
Tramonti, directly translatable as "in the mountains", is located along the Via Chiunzi which leads to Maiori and the Amalfi Coast. The town is bordered by Cava de' Tirreni, Corbara, Lettere, Maiori, Nocera Inferiore, Nocera Superiore, Pagani, Ravello and Sant'Egidio del Monte Albino.

History
Tramonti was perhaps founded by the Romans. It  was an important town of the Maritime Republic of Amalfi, an important trading power in the Mediterranean between 839 AD and around 1200 AD.

Main sights

Cappella Rupestre (Chapel in the Rock), in the village of Gete. A 13th century church in a slight hollow of the rock, housing tombs cut into the rocky side.
Church of the Ascension
Church of Sant'Elia (Church of St. Elia), in the village of Sant'Elia.  
Church of San Giovanni (Church of St. John), in the village of Polvica. 
Church of Pietro Apostolo (Church St. Peter Apostle), in the village of Figlino.  
Church of Sant'Erasmo
Castle of Montalto and Hermitage of St. Catherine, at Paterno sant'Elia. It was built by the Republic of Amalfi on a cliff of the Monti Lattari to protect its territories from the northern side. It was stormed by the Normans in 1127 when the latter conquered the Republic.
Castle of Santa Maria La Nova. It was built around 1457 by Raimondo Orsini, Prince of Salerno and overlord of the Duchy of Amalfi. A rectangular base was fortified by ten small square towers and seven ramparts, only some of which still stands.  
Convent of Saint Francis, founded in 1474.  
Monastery of St. Joseph and St. Teresa, built in 1662

Economy
Vineyards, lemon orchards and chestnut woodlands are in abundance in this town.

Twin towns
 Pézilla-la-Rivière, France, since 2001

See also
Amalfi Coast
Chiunzi
Sorrentine Peninsula

References

External links

 Official website
 Practical Guide Tramonti

Cities and towns in Campania
Amalfi Coast